Trymalitis optima is a species of moth of the family Tortricidae. It is found in Australia (Queensland), Madagascar, Indonesia and New Guinea.

Adults have brown forewings, with brown-edged orange spots at the apex, the costa and in the middle. The hindwings are plain brown.

References

Moths described in 1911
Chlidanotini
Moths of Madagascar
Moths of Africa